Robert Macon may refer to:

 Robert B. Macon (1859–1925), U.S. Representative from Arkansas
 Robert C. Macon (1890–1980), U.S. Army general

See also
 Robert le Maçon (1365–1443), chancellor of France